Zep or ZEP may refer to:
 Zep (cartoonist) (real name Philippe Chappuis), the creator of comics character Titeuf
 Zep, Inc., cleaning products company
Zeaxanthin epoxidase 
 Jo Jo Zep of Australian band Jo Jo Zep & The Falcons
 Captain Zep – Space Detective, a British children's TV programme
 Led Zeppelin, as a shortened nickname
 Zero Emission Fossil Fuel Power Plants, a European organisation aiming to reduce greenhouse gas emissions
 Zep Solar, manufactures equipment for installing solar panels 
 ZEP-RE, Kenyan reinsurance company 
 Žep, a mountain in Bosnia and Herzegovina
Book of Zephaniah, abbreviated Zep. or Zep

See also
 Zepp 
Valdis Zeps